Colbie Bell (born 3 November 1971) is a Canadian wrestler. He competed in the men's Greco-Roman 100 kg at the 1996 Summer Olympics.

References

1971 births
Living people
Canadian male sport wrestlers
Olympic wrestlers of Canada
Wrestlers at the 1996 Summer Olympics
Wrestlers at the 2003 Pan American Games
Sportspeople from Edmonton
Pan American Games medalists in wrestling
Pan American Games bronze medalists for Canada
20th-century Canadian people